Stefano Travaglia was the defending champion but chose not to defend his title.

Arthur De Greef won the title after defeating Nino Serdarušić 4–6, 6–4, 6–2 in the final.

Seeds

Draw

Finals

Top half

Bottom half

References
Main Draw
Qualifying Draw

Prosperita Open - Singles
2018 Singles